Acer tataricum, the Tatar maple or Tatarian maple, is a species of maple widespread across central and southeastern Europe and temperate Asia, from Austria and Turkey east as far as Japan and the Russian Far East. The species is named after the Tatar peoples of southern Russia; the tree's name is similarly commonly also misspelled "Tartar" or "Tartarian" in English.

Description

The bark is thin, pale brown, and smooth at first but becoming shallowly fissured on old plants. The flowers are whitish-green,  diameter, produced in spreading panicles in spring as the leaves open.

Taxonomy 
Subspecies
subspecies accepted by the Plant List maintained by Kew Gardens in London.
Acer tataricum subsp. aidzuense (Franch.) P.C.DeJong 	
Acer tataricum subsp. ginnala (Maxim.) Wesm. 	 Japan, Korea, Mongolia, eastern Russia, northeastern and central China
Acer tataricum subsp. semenovii (Regel & Herder) A.E.Murray - Tibet, Afghanistan, southern Russia, Iran
Acer tataricum subsp. tataricum - Caucasus, Turkey, Austria, Hungary, Romania, Serbia, Ukraine
Acer tataricum subsp. theiferum (W.P.Fang) Y.S.Chen & P.C.de Jong - China

Acer tataricum is related to Acer ginnala (Amur maple) from northeastern Asia; this is treated as a subspecies of Tatar maple (Acer tataricum subsp. ginnala) by some botanists but not by others. They differ conspicuously in the glossy, deeply lobed leaves of A. ginnala, compared to the matte, unlobed or only shallowly lobed leaves of A. tataricum.

Gallery

Cultivation and uses
Tatar maple is occasionally grown as an ornamental plant in gardens throughout Europe and also in North America. In Russia, it is valued in farmland shelterbelts. It is locally naturalised in eastern North America.

References

External links
 
 photo of herbarium specimen at Missouri Botanical Garden

tataricum
Trees of Europe
Trees of Asia
Flora of Central Asia
Flora of Eastern Asia
Flora of Eastern Europe
Flora of Western Asia
Flora of temperate Asia
Plants described in 1753
Taxa named by Carl Linnaeus